Pontikonisi ("mouse island") is an uninhabited islet off the coast of western Crete. Administratively, it is part of the municipality Kissamos, in Chania regional unit. There is a small islet close to Pontikonisi called Pontikaki ("little mouse").

See also
Pontikonisi, an islet off the shore of Corfu
List of islands of Greece

Landforms of Chania (regional unit)
Uninhabited islands of Crete
Mediterranean islands
Islands of Greece